Elroy is a small unincorporated community  south of Austin in southeastern  Travis County, Texas, United States.

General Antonio López de Santa Anna gave modern-day Elroy to a loyal officer, who swapped it for a horse and saddle to return to Mexico.  The Elroy community, also known as Driskill, Dutch Waterhole, or Hume, was established 1892, named by a local store owner after his son, Leroy. A post office opened in Elroy in 1899, with George L. Hume as postmaster. This post office was discontinued in 1902, and mail was sent to Del Valle. In 1907, Elroy had a two-teacher school, for 107 white students, and a one-teacher school for 61 black students. Elroy schools were later consolidated in 1961 with the Colorado district, which the next year became the Del Valle Independent School District. The population of Elroy grew from 25 in 1933, to 125 in 1947. Its population was still reported as 125 for the 2000 Decennial Census.

Elroy serves as the principal site of a state-of-the-art FIA specification Circuit of the Americas motor sport facility that currently hosts the World Endurance Championship, MotoGP, and the Formula 1 United States Grand Prix. Elroy is home to the historic Moline Swedish Lutheran Cemetery, and other sites of Swedish-Texan heritage.

Education
Elroy is served by the Del Valle Independent School District. Popham Elementary School, Del Valle Middle School, and Del Valle High School serve students.

The East Travis Gateway Library District operates the Elroy Library.

References

External links

Unincorporated communities in Texas
Unincorporated communities in Travis County, Texas